North Haven is a north-western suburb of Adelaide, in the state of South Australia, Australia. It is located 20km from the CBD, and falls under the City of Port Adelaide Enfield. It is adjacent to Osborne and Outer Harbour. The post code for North Haven is 5018. It is bounded to the north and east by Oliver Rogers and Victoria Road, to the south by Marmora Terrace and the west by Gulf St Vincent.

The small residential area north of the Gulf Point Marina is a part of Outer Harbour, though it lies within the boundaries of North Haven.

History
North Haven originally started as a private sub-division in Section 769 in the cadastral unit of Hundred of Port Adelaide.  Its creation in 1976 was originally opposed by the Postmaster General of Australia due to "size & duplication of name else in Australia".  Its boundaries have been altered as follows since 1976 – boundary with the suburb of Outer Harbour, addition of land from the suburb of Osborne and other 'unnamed land', and the addition of a 'portion of the Harbour' in February 2007.

Facilities
The suburb is served by a retirement village on Military Road, a small shopping centre on Osborne Road. That has many retail stores and is home to a supermarket, a chemist and a Bakery as well as other restaurants and businesses. The western coastal side of the suburb contains a newly constructed Surf Lifesaving Club (completed in 2007), and the Gulf Point Marina which is home to a large sailing community. The marina, lined with exclusive houses, is protected by two artificial breakwaters. Attached to the marina is the Cruising Yacht Club of South Australia, one of Adelaide's largest yacht clubs.

The local cricket club is the North Haven Cricket Club which fields numerous teams in Adelaide and Suburban Cricket Association.

Education
North Haven is also home to a local Primary School (North Haven School R-7) and a Kindergarten (North Haven Kindergarten) North Haven does not have a high school, but there is one in the nearby suburb of Taperoo (Ocean View College B-12).

Transport
The 330 bus services both Lady Gowrie and Osborne Roads and Osborne and Victoria Roads. The Outer Harbour railway line terminates at Outer Harbour railway station. The suburb is serviced by two more train stations, North Haven railway station and Osborne railway station.

Governance
North Haven is located within the federal division of Hindmarsh, the state electoral district of Port Adelaide and the local government area of the City of Port Adelaide Enfield.

References

External links

 Royal South Australian Yacht Squadron
 Cruising Yacht Club of SA Inc.

Suburbs of Adelaide
Lefevre Peninsula